Chung-shin Chen served as the General Secretary of the Boy Scouts of China.
In 1982, Chen was awarded the 157th Bronze Wolf, the only distinction of the World Organization of the Scout Movement, awarded by the World Scout Committee for exceptional services to world Scouting.

External links

https://www.scout.org/BronzeWolfAward/list 

Recipients of the Bronze Wolf Award
Year of birth missing
Scouting in Taiwan